The 2019 Harvard Crimson football team represented Harvard University during the 2019 NCAA Division I FCS football season as a member of the Ivy League. They were led by 26th-year head coach Tim Murphy and played their home games at Harvard Stadium. They finished the season 4–6 overall and 2–5 in Ivy League play to tie for sixth place. Harvard averaged 10,812 fans per game.

Previous season
The Crimson finished the 2018 season 6–4, 4–3 in Ivy League play to finish in third place.

Preseason

Preseason media poll
The Ivy League released their preseason media poll on August 8, 2019. The Crimson were picked to finish in fourth place.

Schedule

Game summaries

at San Diego

Brown

Howard

Cornell

at Holy Cross

at Princeton

Dartmouth

at Columbia

Penn

at Yale

References

Harvard
Harvard Crimson football seasons
Harvard Crimson football
Harvard Crimson football